The 2014 season was FH's 30th season in Úrvalsdeild and their 14th consecutive season in top-flight of Icelandic Football.

Heimir Guðjónsson head coached the team for the 7th consecutive season and after a trophyless season in 2013 FH went into the season as one of the favorites for the title.

On 25 April FH won the Lengjubikarinn after a convincing win over Breiðablik 4–1

FH went through the 2014 league unbeaten until the last game where they met Stjarnan, who were also unbeaten, in a final for the title. FH lost the game on an injury time penalty and ended the season as runners-up in the league.

FH were defeated in the 32nd-finals of the Borgunarbikarinn by eventual winners KR on 28 May.

After a 2nd-place finish in 2013 FH earned a place in the Europa League Qualification. FH was drawn against Glenavon F.C. from N.Ireland in round 1. FH won the tie 6–2 and were drawn against FC Neman Grodno, from Belarus, in round 2. FH came on top with a 3–1 victory over the two legged tie. In the 3rd round FH were drawn against the Swedish team IF Elfsborg. FH lost the tie 5–3.

First team

Transfers in

Transfers out

Loans Out

Pre-season

Fótbolti.net Cup
FH took part in Fótbolti.net Cup, a pre-season tournament for clubs outside of Reykjavík, in January. The team was drawn in Group 1 in A-deild with 3 other teams; Keflavik, Breiðablik and Grindavík. FH finished top of the group with 2 wins and 1 defeat. They played Stjarnan in the final which they lost 3–1.

Atlantic Cup
FH played in The Atlantic Cup, a pre-season friendly tournament held in Algarve, Portugal. The tournament was contested of 8 teams from 6 countries. FH played 3 games against Örebro SK, FC Spartak Moscow and SV Mattersburg and lost all three. FH ended in 8th and last place.

Lengjubikar
Lengjubikarinn, the Icelandic league cup, was held from 14 February to 25 April. It was played in 3 groups and FH were drawn in Group 2 along with 7 other teams. FH came second in the group and went through to the quarter-finals where they won Stjarnan. In the semi-finals they defeated KR on penalties and in the finals they won Breiðablik 4–1, with a hattrick from Ingimundur Níels, thus becoming Lengjubikar champions. This was FH's 6th league cup.

Matches

Borgunarbikar
FH came into the Borgunarbikar, Icelandic cup, in the 3rd round (32nd finals) where they were drawn against KR. FH lost the game 1–0.

Matches

Úrvalsdeild
After a good preseason and winning the Lengjubikar FH came into the season with good confidence. FH started the season with a home game against Breiðablik, ending in a draw 1–1. FH went through the season unbeaten until the last game of the season, where they met Stjarnan in a final for the title. Both team were unbeaten but FH needed just a draw to secure the title. Stjarnan took the lead on 40th minute through a controversial goal. FH came back and equalised on 64th minute through a goal from Steven Lennon. On 59th minute Veigar Páll got sent off for Stjarnan and FH took control of the game but missed some good chances. They were made to pay, in stoppage time Kassim Doumbia fouled Ólafur Karl of Stjarnan inside FH's penalty area and the referee pointed to the spot. Ólafur Karl scored from the penalty spot securing Stjarnan first ever Úrvalsdeild title.

Table

Matches

Summary of results

Points breakdown
 Points at home: 24
 Points away from home: 27
 6 Points: Valur, Fylkir, Víkingur R, Fjölnir, Fram
 4 Points: Breiðablik, Keflavík, Þór, KR, ÍBV
 1 Points: Stjarnan

Europa League
FH played in the Europa League qualification from 3 July to 7 August, they came into the tournament in the 1st round. They were drawn against the N.Ireland team Glenavon and they won the tie 6–2, 3–0 in the first leg at home and 3–2 in the second leg. In the 2nd round FH were drawn against Neman Grodno from Belarus. The tie ended 3–1 for FH, 1–1 away and 2–0 at home. FH then got eliminated in the 3rd round against the Swedish team Elfsborg 5–3, 2–1 at home and 1–4 away.

These 6 games took FH's total appearances in Europe to a total of 29. Atli Guðnason scored 4 goals in these games and he now has 10 goals in European cup games.

Matches

Statistics

Appearances
Includes all competitive matches; Úrvalsdeild, Borgunarbikar, Lengjubikar and Europa League.

Numbers in parentheses are sub appearances.

Squad Stats
Includes all competitive matches; Úrvalsdeild, Borgunarbikar, Lengjubikar and Europa League.
{|class="wikitable" style="text-align: center;"
|-
!
! style="width:70px;"|Úrvalsdeild
! style="width:70px;"|Borgunarbikar
! style="width:70px;"|Lengjubikar
! style="width:70px;"|Europa League
! style="width:70px;"|Total
|-
|align=left|Games played       ||22 || 1 || 10 || 6 || 39
|-
|align=left|Games won          ||15 || 0 || 8 || 4 || 27
|-
|align=left|Games drawn        || 6 || 0 || 0 || 1 || 7
|-
|align=left|Games lost         || 1 || 1 || 2 || 1 || 5
|-
|align=left|Goals scored       || 46 || 0 || 30 || 12 || 88
|-
|align=left|Goals conceded     || 17 || 1 || 10 || 8 || 36
|-
|align=left|Clean sheets       || 10 || 0 || 2 || 2 || 14
|-
|align=left|Yellow cards       || 34 || 4 || 15 || 9 || 62
|-
|align=left|Red cards          || 4 || 1 || 2 || 1 || 8
|-

Goal scorers
Includes all competitive matches; Úrvalsdeild, Borgunarbikar, Lengjubikar and Europa League.
{| class="wikitable sortable" style="font-size: 95%; text-align: center;"
|-
!width="7%"|No.
!width="7%"|Pos.
!width="7%"|Nation
!width="20%"|Name
!Úrvalsdeild
!Borgunarbikar
!Lengjubikar
!Europa League
!Total
|-
| 7
| MF
| 
| Ingimundur Níels Óskarsson
| 4
| 0
| 9 
| 2
|15 
|-
| 11
| FW
| 
| Atli Guðnason
| 10 
| 0
| 1
| 4
|15 
|-
| 13
| FW
| 
| Kristján Gauti Emilsson
| 5 
| 0
| 7
| 3
|15 
|-
| 17
| FW
| 
| Atli Viðar Björnsson
| 8 
| 0
| 3
| 1
|12 
|-
| 8
| MF
| 
| Emil Pálsson
| 2 
| 0
| 5
| 0
|7 
|-
| 19
| FW
| 
| Steven Lennon
| 6 
| 0
| 0
| 1
|7 
|-
| 20
| DF
| 
| Kassim Doumbia
| 4 
| 0
| 0
| 1
|5 
|-
| 6
| MF
| 
| Sam Hewson
| 1 
| 0
| 1
| 0
|2 
|-
| 25
| MF
| 
| Hólmar Örn Rúnarsson
| 1 
| 0
| 1
| 0
|2 
|-
| 2
| DF
| 
| Sam Tillen
| 0 
| 0
| 1
| 0
|1 
|-
| 10
| MF
| 
| Davíð Þór Viðarsson
| 0 
| 0
| 1
| 0
|1 
|-
| 14
| FW
| 
| Albert Brynjar Ingason
| 0 
| 0
| 1
| 0
|1 
|-
| 16
| DF
| 
| Jón Ragnar Jónsson
| 1 
| 0
| 0
| 0
|1 
|-
| colspan=4 | Own Goals
| 4
| 0
| 0
| 0
|4 
|-
|- bgcolor="F1F1F1" 
| colspan=4 | TOTAL
| 46
| 0
| 30
| 12
|88 
|-

Disciplinary record
Includes all competitive matches; Úrvalsdeild, Borgunarbikar, Lengjubikar and Europa League.

References

Fimleikafélag Hafnarfjarðar
Fimleikafelag Hafnarfjardar